Kocaaliler is a town (belde) in the Bucak District, Burdur Province, Turkey. Its population is 2,339 (2021). It is situated to the west of Karacaören dam reservoir and state highway D.685. Most pronounced crop of the town is fig and an annual fig festival is held in the town.

References

Populated places in Burdur Province
Towns in Turkey
Populated places in Bucak District